William James Wade (October 4, 1930 – March 9, 2016) was an American professional football player who was a quarterback in the National Football League (NFL). He is considered one of the greatest athletes in Nashville and Vanderbilt University history. Wade is a member of the Tennessee Sports Hall of Fame. He is best known for being the starting quarterback on the Chicago Bears' 1963 NFL championship team.

College career
Wade played for Vanderbilt University. He was named the Southeastern Conference's (SEC) Most Valuable Player and a second-team All-American. He was named MVP of the 1951 North–South Shrine Game in Miami. Wade also played in the Senior Bowl of 1952 and was selected to play in the College All-Star Game in Chicago.

Professional career
He was the first player selected in the 1952 NFL draft, by the Los Angeles Rams, but did not join the team until 1954 because of military service.

Quarterbacking the Rams for seven seasons, Wade's best year statistically was 1958, when he led the NFL in passing yards with 2,875. He asked to be traded to the Bears in 1961 and was sent with teammates Del Shofner and John Guzik for two players and a draft pick. Wade topped the league in 1962 in pass completions and attempts, and threw for 466 yards on Nov 11 in Dallas, second in franchise history to Johnny Lujack (468). He was the first Bear to record four games with 300+ passing yards in a season. In 1963, he led Chicago to the 1963 NFL Championship Game, scoring both Bears touchdowns on two 5-yard drives after turnovers in a 14–10 victory over the New York Giants in a game played in freezing weather conditions at Wrigley Field.

After retiring from football in 1966, he was offered a position as the QB's coach with the Bears. Wade held the position for one year, before being offered to replace George Halas as the team head coach. He declined the opportunity at his father's advice, and the position was filled by Jim Dooley.

Personal life
Wade was named to the Vanderbilt Athletics Hall of Fame as part of its inaugural class.

Following eye surgery for glaucoma, Wade became legally blind. In an interview with Mike Downey of the Chicago Tribune on January 30, 2007, days before the Bears played in Super Bowl XLI in Miami Gardens, Florida, Wade said from his Nashville home, "I could get there for the game, but I can't see it." He added: "I've got a Bears cap on right now." He died on March 9, 2016, in Nashville.

References

1930 births
2016 deaths
American football quarterbacks
Chicago Bears players
Los Angeles Rams players
Vanderbilt Commodores football players
National Football League first-overall draft picks
Western Conference Pro Bowl players
Players of American football from Nashville, Tennessee